Saint-Hilaire-sur-Benaize (literally Saint-Hilaire on Benaize) is a commune in the Indre department in central France.

Geography
The commune is located in the parc naturel régional de la Brenne.

The river Benaize forms part of the commune's southern border, flows north through the commune, crossing the village of Saint-Hilaire-sur-Benaize, then flows into the Anglin, which forms part of the commune's northeastern border.

Population

See also
Communes of the Indre department

References

Communes of Indre